Soul Sounds  is the debut album by soul singer Chris Clark, released in 1967 (catalogue number MOS 664). As a white artist on a label for which artists were predominantly black, the album made Clark a cult heroine. The album is considered one of Motown's most collectable.

Track listing

Reception
Allmusic  [ link]

References

1967 debut albums
Tamla Records albums